The Buzzard's Shadow is a 1915 American silent  military drama film directed by Thomas Ricketts starring Harold Lockwood and May Allison. U.S. troops appear in the film, which was shot in San Diego at the San Diego Military Reservation.

The film was produced by the American Film Company and released as a Mutual Film Masterpiece. In 1918 the film was re-edited and re-released by the Arrow Film Corporation under the title, The Shadow of Fear.

Plot

Cast
The cast of The Buzzard's Shadow is documented by the American Film Institute.
Harold Lockwood as Sergeant Barnes
May Allison as Alice Corbett
William Stowell as Dr. Deschamps
Harry von Meter as Unitah, the half-breed
Alice Ann Rooney as Areep, the squaw
Dick La Reno as Colonel Sears
Betty Hart as Mrs. Sears
Virginia Fordyce as Barbara Corbett

References

External links

 lantern slide (Wayback Machine)

1915 films
1915 drama films
Silent American drama films
American silent feature films
American black-and-white films
Films shot in San Diego
American Film Company films
Films directed by Tom Ricketts
1910s American films